MSCI Inc. is an American finance company headquartered in New York City. MSCI is a global provider of equity, fixed income, real estate indexes, multi-asset portfolio analysis tools, ESG and climate products. It operates the MSCI World, MSCI All Country World Index (ACWI), MSCI Emerging Markets Indexes.

The company is headquartered at 7 World Trade Center in Manhattan, New York City, U.S.

History
In 1968, Capital International published indexes covering the global stock market for non-U.S. markets. In 1986, Morgan Stanley licensed the rights to the indexes from Capital International and branded the indexes as the Morgan Stanley Capital International (MSCI) indexes. By the 1980s, the MSCI indexes were the primary benchmark indexes outside of the U.S. before being joined by FTSE, Citibank, and Standard & Poor's. After Dow Jones started float weighting its index funds, MSCI followed. In 2004, MSCI acquired Barra, Inc., to form MSCI Barra. In mid-2007, parent company Morgan Stanley decided to divest MSCI. This was followed by an initial public offering of a minority of stock in November 2007. The divestment was completed in 2009. The company is headquartered in New York City.

Some companies in MSCI's peer group includes Glass Lewis, Factset, Sovereign Wealth Fund Institute, and Standard & Poor's.

Acquisitions 

In 2010 MSCI acquired RiskMetrics Group, Inc. and Measurisk.

In 2012 MSCI acquired Investment Property Databank.

In 2013, MSCI acquired Investor Force from ICG Group (formerly Internet Capital Group).

In August 2014, MSCI acquired GMI Ratings.

In October 2019, MSCI acquired Carbon Delta, a Zurich-based climate change analytics company.

In September 2021, MSCI acquired Real Capital Analytics.

Collaborations 
In October 2021, MSCI and Cboe Global Markets signed a licensing agreement that would see MSCI grow its options product suite and allow them to work on other projects as well.

In April 2022, MSCI entered into a collaboration with MarketAxess on fixed income indices, portfolio construction solutions, and ESG data, using MSCI's ESG data and MarketAxess' pricing and liquidity indicators.

Indexes
The MSCI global equity indexes have been calculated since 1969 and include MSCI World and MSCI EAFE. Initially, the company used eight factors in developing its indexes: momentum, volatility, value, size, growth, size nonlinearity, liquidity, and financial leverage.

Inclusion of Chinese stocks
In 2018 MSCI announced it would begin including mainland Chinese "A" shares in its MSCI Emerging Markets Index. Initially the domestic Chinese companies received a 5% weighting in the index. MSCI is the last major index provider to include the companies, but some investors have questioned the risk as many Chinese listed companies refuse to permit the Public Company Accounting Oversight Board to inspect their financial records. The action of including Chinese stocks into MSCI EM Index also received criticism and questions from Senator Marco Rubio and some others regarding the U.S. national security.

In February 2019, The Wall Street Journal reported the decision was the result of pressure from the Chinese government according to people familiar with the matter. The New York Times reported that "The Chinese government long sought MSCI inclusion because it could help establish Shanghai and Shenzhen as global financial centers." MSCI chief executive and chairman Henry Fernandez stated there was "zero politics" behind the decision. In March 2019, CNBC reported that MSCI have a future plan of inclusion based on market capitalization of mainland Chinese shares in its global benchmarks, which will eventually lead to ca. 40% weights of its global emerging markets index.

In April 2020, it was reported that Donald Trump was considering an executive action to prohibit the Thrift Savings Plan from transferring $50 billion to mirror the MSCI All Country World Index fund. In December 2020, MSCI announced that it would strip its indexes of seven Chinese companies in response to Executive Order 13959.

In November 2022, a study by Sheffield Hallam University and Hong Kong Watch identified three major stock indexes provided by MSCI that include at least 13 companies allegedly involved in forced labor and mass surveillance of Uyghurs.

References

External links

 

1968 establishments in New York City
2007 initial public offerings
American companies established in 1968
Companies listed on the New York Stock Exchange
Exchange-traded funds
Financial services companies based in New York City
Financial services companies established in 1968
Morgan Stanley
Publicly traded companies based in New York City